Álvaro Burrell (born 29 April 1969) is a Spanish athlete. He competed in the men's decathlon at the 1992 Summer Olympics.

References

1969 births
Living people
Athletes (track and field) at the 1992 Summer Olympics
Spanish decathletes
Olympic athletes of Spain
People from Cinca Medio
Sportspeople from the Province of Huesca